Los Tipitos is a rock band formed in 1994 in the Argentine city of Mar del Plata in the Buenos Aires Province. The band is influenced by important icons of Argentinian rock as Charly García and León Gieco.

Members 
 Raúl Ruffino (guitar and voice)
 Federico Bugallo (bass)
 Walter Piancioli (guitar and voice)
 Pablo Tévez (drums)

Discography

Albums 
 Primera Grabación (1995)
 Los Tipitos (1996)
 ¿Quién va a garpar todo esto? (Vol. 1) (1998)
 Jingle Bells (EP) (1998)
 Cocrouchis (1999)
 Vintage (2001)
 Contra los Molinos (2002)
 ¿Quién va a garpar todo esto? (Vol. 2) (2002)
 Armando Camaleón (2004)
 TipitoRex (2006)
 Tan Real (2007)
 El Club de los Martes (2010)
 Grandes Éxitos - Los Tipitos (2010)
 Push (2013)

DVDs 
 TipitoRex DVD (2006)
 Tan Real Edición CD/DVD (2007)

References

External links 

 Official Website of Los Tipitos 

Argentine rock music groups
Rock en Español music groups
1994 establishments in Argentina
Musical groups established in 1994
People from Mar del Plata